Rafael Bejarano (born June 23, 1982 in Arequipa, Peru) is a champion jockey in American Thoroughbred horse racing. He trained at the Peruvian national riding school before embarking on his professional career in 1999. Having met with success, including winning the apprentice riding title at Hipódromo de Monterrico in Lima, he emigrated to the United States in the spring of 2002 and settled in Louisville, Kentucky. He got his first win on July 10 that year at River Downs in Cincinnati, Ohio and went on to major race wins in Kentucky and on the New York Racing Association circuit.

In 2004, Rafael Bejarano got his big break when he was the United States Champion Jockey by wins with 455. As part of his 2004 success, on March 12 at Turfway Park in Florence, Kentucky he won seven races on a single race card and ended the meet with a track-record 196 wins. In 2004, his earnings were $12,212,308 out of 1,922 mounts finishing 8th in the national earnings list. In the American Classic Races, he finished eighth aboard Andromeda's Hero in the 2005 Kentucky Derby then rode him to a second-place finish in the Belmont Stakes In 2005 he finished the year with earnings of $14,436,781 with 263 winners, and was 4th in the national earnings list. In the 2006 Derby he finished ninth on Point Determined. He first rode in the Preakness Stakes in 2004 and got his best result in 2005 with a fourth-place finish on Sun King.

In the 2007 Blue Grass Stakes Bejarano scored a dramatic upset win with Dominican, defeating the 2006 U.S. Champion 2-year-old colt, Street Sense. Bejarano also won the 2008 Track Meet at Santa Anita. He had a grand total of 67 wins. Also, he won the Hollywood Park meet and Del Mar meet as well.

Bejarano in 2008 swept all 5 of the major Southern California titles and for that he was a finalist for the Eclipse Award for Outstanding Jockey for 2008. But lost it. For his 2008 season he had 266 winners out of 1,290 mounts with earnings of $16,439,729.

In 2009, he won the Santa Anita and Oak Tree titles. Then finished the 2009 year with 240 winners out of 1,129 mounts with earnings of $12,403,993.

Year-end charts

References

1982 births
Living people
American jockeys
American Champion jockeys
People from Arequipa
Peruvian emigrants to the United States
Jockeys from Louisville, Kentucky